Rudolf Gossweiler (born 8 January 1882) was a Swiss footballer who played as striker or as midfielder during the late 1890s and early 1900s.

Football career
Gossweiler joined Basel's first team for their 1899–1900 season. During this season FCB did not play domestic league football, but they played 16 friendly matches. Gossweiler played his first game for the club in the home game on 1 April 1900 as Basel won 6–0 against newly formed FC Kleinbasel.

In their 1900–01 season Basel contested the 1900–01 Swiss Serie A, being assigned to the East group. Gossweiler made his domestic league debut for the club in the away game on 10 March 1901 against FC Fortuna Basel. FCB protested because of the unplayable pitch, the protest was granted, Fortuna subsequently waivered a replay and the match was awarded forfait. Gossweiler scored his first goal for his club in the home game on 15 March 1903. In fact he scored two goals in that game as Basel won 8–1 against French team FC Mulhouse.

Gossweiler played with Basel for four seasons. The afore mentioned game against Mulhouse was his last game for the club, because in the summer of 1903 Gossweiler then moved to Belgium. There he joined and played for Royal Antwerp.

During 1908 he returned to Switzerland and rejoined his club of origin. In his first league match after his return, Gossweiler scored his first league goal for his club in the home game in the Landhof on 11 October 1908. But this goal could not help the team, because Basel suffered a defeat against Young Fellows Zürich. Gossweiler played another two seasons with Basel before he retired from active football. Between the years 1899 to 1903 and again from 1908 until 1910 Gossweiler played a total of 41 games for Basel scoring at least the three afore mentioned goals. 21 of these games were in the Nationalliga A and 20 were friendly games.

Footnotes

References

Sources
 Rotblau: Jahrbuch Saison 2017/2018. Publisher: FC Basel Marketing AG. 
 Die ersten 125 Jahre. Publisher: Josef Zindel im Friedrich Reinhardt Verlag, Basel. 
 Verein "Basler Fussballarchiv" Homepage
(NB: Despite all efforts, the editors of these books and the authors in "Basler Fussballarchiv" have failed to be able to identify all the players, their date and place of birth or date and place of death, who played in the games during the early years of FC Basel)

FC Basel players
Swiss men's footballers
Royal Antwerp F.C. players
Association football midfielders
Association football forwards
Swiss Super League players
1882 births
Date of death missing